The 2021–22 George Washington Colonials men's basketball team represented George Washington University during the 2021–22 NCAA Division I men's basketball season. The team was led by third-year head coach Jamion Christian, and played their home games at Charles E. Smith Center in Washington, D.C. as a member of the Atlantic 10 Conference.

Previous season
In a season limited due to the ongoing COVID-19 pandemic, the Colonials finished the 2020–21 season with a 5–12 record and a 3–5 record in Atlantic 10 play. They defeated Fordham in the first round of the 2021 Atlantic 10 men's basketball tournament before losing to George Mason.

Offseason

Departures

Incoming transfers

Recruiting classes

2021 recruiting class

2022 recruiting class

Roster

Schedule and results 

|-
!colspan=12 style=|Exhibition

|-
!colspan=12 style=|Non-conference regular season

|-
!colspan=12 style=|Atlantic 10 Regular Season

|-
!colspan=12 style=|A-10 tournament

Source

References

George Washington Colonials men's basketball seasons
George Washington Colonials
George Washington Colonials men's basketball
George Washington Colonials men's basketball